La ladra is a 1955 Italian-French crime-melodrama film co-written and directed by Mario Bonnard and starring Lise Bourdin and Fausto Tozzi.

Plot  
Whistle is an orphaned boy, raised in an environment unsuitable for a budding child and thief. A shady lawyer, an accomplice of thieves and fences, entrusts him to Nino, the leader of a gang that is preparing a particularly valuable coup. On the appointed day, Whistle and Bebè, accompanied by Nino who passes himself off as an employer, must present themselves at Countess Barenghi's house as chimney sweeps, but Whistle seriously injures himself falling from the chimney and sends the blow upstream. Anna, who has lost a small son and has begun to become attached to the child, pretends to be his mother to take him away but the doctor, called by the countess, forbids him to move. The two thus live a few days in that strange house, during which they become attached to each other. In the meantime, Nino, feeling abandoned, has found a new lover in Mary, a no good one who follows him in the planned coup but who, in an attempt to take possession of the stolen goods, reports him to the police. Nino manages to go untraceable after hiding the loot in Anna's house who, unaware of everything, returns a few days later with Whistle and where the police end up finding it. Anna is obviously arrested while Whistle (who in the meantime had him baptized giving him the name Paolo, that of her missing son), ends up in a boarding school at the expense of the countess, who believes in the innocence of the woman and also pays the expenses of a lawyer. With the support of Don Pietro and the same lawyer, Anna reacts firmly to prove her innocence, which will only happen with Nino's arrest.

Cast 
Lise Bourdin as Anna 
Fausto Tozzi as Nino
Carlo D'Angelo as Don Pietro
 Henry Vilbert as Lawyer
Lyla Rocco as Mary
 Piero Giagnoni as Fischio
Memmo Carotenuto as Ciuffo
Carlo Delle Piane as Bebè 
Lauro Gazzolo as Butler
Carla Calò as Gemma
Vera Carmi as Countess Barenghi
 Cristina Pall as Housekeeper
 Franco Jamonte as Milo 
Gildo Bocci as Professor 
Renato Navarrini as Doctor 
Enrico Glori as Brigadier
Saro Urzì as Caporale
Mino Doro as Arrighi

References

External links
 

1955 crime drama films
1955 films
Films directed by Mario Bonnard
Italian crime drama films
French crime drama films
Melodrama films
1950s Italian films
1950s French films